DD Sahyadri is a Marathi TV channel. It is a regional channel dedicated to Maharashtra. It shows Marathi serials, news, films infotainment and educational programs about agriculture, healthcare, and other subjects. It is part of Doordarshan network. It is a Free-to-air channel.

Name
The name 'Sahyadri' in 'DD Sahyadri' comes from the a group of hills in the Western Ghats. This is similar to how other regional DD channels are named.

History
2 October 1972 (Gandhi Jayanti): Doordarshan Kendra Mumbai started broadcasting two hours a day on DD National in black-and-white. The transmission was broadcast using a small transmitter that served few TV households.

15 August 1994 (Independence Day): DD Sahyadri was launched as separate channel as RLSS Marathi (DD 10) throughout India.

2 June 1999: A new studio for DD Sahyadri was inaugurated.

1 January 2000: DD 10 broadcast time increased to seventeen hours a day.

5 April 2000: DD 10 was renamed DD Sahyadri.

Description
DD Sahyadri broadcasts serials, informative programmes, public debates, and film-based programmes. Old and new Marathi films shown on this channel. DD Sahyadri offers about six to eight event properties a year with the big ones being the annual DD Awards, Hirkhani Awards (felicitating women achievers) and the Navaratan Awards. DD Sahyadri is supported by Doordarshan studios in Mumbai, Pune and Nagpur. It makes an annual live telecast of Dahihandi Mahotsav from Thane.

DD Sahyadri's Mission is 'To inform, Educate and Entertain Marathi knowing people in their language, idiom & Culture' and 'To showcase the Real Maharashtra Culture, its values, traditions, modernization, diversity and its unity through programmes of high quality in the highest tradition of Public Service Broadcasting with true Indian National Spirit'.

Competitors and Ranking
The channel competes with private channels such as Zee Marathi, Colors Marathi, Star Pravah, Sony Marathi and Zee Yuva and FTA channels such as Fakt Marathi. In the TAM Report for the week ending on 5 March 2011, DD Sahyadri was ranked the most watched Marathi-language channel with 32.4% reach. Sahyadri is also considered the best regional TV channel, compared to other regional Doordarshan TV channels. In week 47 of 2020, 7 chya Batmya comes in Top 5 Marathi TV shows. Also, in lockdown of 2020, 7 chya Batmya always top the TRP charts.

Broadcast Timings

Monthly Programme Composition

New versus Repeat Programmes in a Month

Classification of Programmes in a Month

Categories of Programmes in a Month

News

News Bulletin Timings

News Headlines Timings

Ratings

Technology
DD Sahyadri is broadcast from eight high power transmitters in Maharashtra located in:
Aurangabad
Ambajogai
Chandrapur
Jalgaon
Mumbai
Nagpur
Pune
Ratnagiri

See also
List of programs broadcast by DD National 
All India Radio 
Ministry of Information and Broadcasting 
DD Free Dish
List of South Asian television channels by country

External links
DD Sahyadri 
 Doordarshan Official Internet site 
Doordarshan news site 
 An article at PFC

References

 

Television stations in Mumbai
Doordarshan
Foreign television channels broadcasting in the United Kingdom
Television channels and stations established in 1994
Direct broadcast satellite services
Indian direct broadcast satellite services
Mass media in Maharashtra
Mass media in Mumbai
Marathi-language television channels
1994 establishments in Maharashtra